Jacob Beser (May 15, 1921 – June 16, 1992) was a lieutenant in the United States Army Air Forces who served during World War II. Beser was the radar specialist aboard the Enola Gay on August 6, 1945, when it dropped the Little Boy atomic bomb on Hiroshima. Three days later, Beser was a crewmember aboard Bockscar when the Fat Man bomb was dropped on Nagasaki. He was the only person to have served as a strike crew member of both of the 1945 atomic bomb missions.

Background
Jacob Beser grew up in Baltimore, Maryland, where he attended the Baltimore City College (high school) graduating in June 1938. Beser then studied mechanical engineering at The Johns Hopkins University, also in Baltimore, but dropped out the day after the attack on Pearl Harbor to enlist in the Army Air Forces. He was Jewish and extremely restless to get into the fight against Hitler. Because of his training and educational background Beser was sent to Los Alamos and worked on the Manhattan Project in the area of weapons firing and fusing. There, he met or worked with various luminaries in the Manhattan Project, such as Robert B. Brode, Norman Ramsey, Niels Bohr, Enrico Fermi, Edward Doll, and General Leslie Groves.

Mission
The unit that dropped the atomic bombs, 509th Composite Group, was activated at Wendover Army Air Field, Utah, December 17, 1944. The crews trained with practice bombs called "pumpkins" because of their size and shape. The pumpkins were useful for training, having been designed to have the same aerodynamic qualities of the Fat Man atomic bomb. The 509th deployed to Tinian in the Marianas in May 1945. It was a self-contained unit, with personnel strength of about 1,770 soldiers, mechanics, specialists and aviators. It consisted of the 393rd Bomber Squadron, the 320th Troop Carrier Squadron, the 390th Air Service Group, the 603rd Air Engineering Squadron, the 1027th Air Materiel Squadron, the 1395th Military Police Company, and the First Ordnance Squadron (in charge of handling the atomic bombs).

On August 6, 1945, the first atomic bomb to be used in combat was dropped by a B-29 Superfortress bomber, the Enola Gay, over the Japanese city of Hiroshima, killing 70,000 people, including 20,000 Japanese combatants and 20,000 Korean slave laborers. The thirteen-hour mission to Hiroshima under the command of famous pilot Colonel Paul Tibbets, began at 0245 Tinian time. By the time the Enola Gay rendezvoused with its two accompanying B-29 Superfortresses at 0607 over Iwo Jima, the group was three hours from the target area. "Little Boy's" detonation was triggered by radar sensors on the bomb that measured its altitude as it fell. Beser's job was to monitor those sensors and ensure that there was no interference that could have detonated it prematurely. The bomb fell away from the aircraft at 09:15:17 Tinian time. Beser did not watch the bomb detonate but he heard the bomb's radar signals switch on and then cut off at the moment the intense light generated by its detonation filled the plane.

Three days later in a second B-29 Superfortress bomber, Bockscar, Beser repeated this task over Nagasaki with Fat Man, the plutonium implosion bomb that became the second and last atomic bomb used in combat. Beser was the only crew member to accompany both atomic bomb missions and besides the commanding officers/pilots, had a scientific understanding of the new weapons' potential and destructiveness, as a result of his earlier high school and university education.

Later life
In 1946, Beser was one of the founding members of Sandia National Laboratories, in New Mexico. He came home to Baltimore and in the mid-1950s began a long career working on defense projects for Westinghouse.

When asked about his atomic bomb missions on numerous interviews, Beser made the following response:

He wrote a book about the experiences of flying on both flights; Hiroshima & Nagasaki Revisited was written in 1988.

Beser was an amateur ("ham") radio operator, holding the callsign W3NOD.

He died of natural causes in 1992 and was survived by his wife Sylvia, their four sons, and nine grandchildren. He was inducted into the "Hall of Fame" of his alma mater high school, Baltimore City College, the third oldest public high school in America.

Military decorations
His decorations include:

Silver Star citation

Beser, Jacob 
First Lieutenant, U.S Army Air Forces
393d Bombardment Squadron, 509th Composite Group, 20th Air Force
Date of Action:   August 6, 1945
Headquarters, 20th Air Force, General Orders No. 69 (September 22, 1945)
Citation:

See also
Tsutomu Yamaguchi – the only survivor acknowledged by the Japanese government to have been on the ground during both nuclear detonations in combat (the Asahi Shimbun located 160 survivors).

Notes

Further reading
Hiroshima: Hubertus Hoffmann meets the only U.S. Officer on both A-Missions and one of his Victims

External links
Audio Recording of 1985 Lecture by Jacob Beser Voices of the Manhattan Project

1921 births
1992 deaths
Jewish American military personnel
Military personnel from Baltimore
United States Army Air Forces personnel of World War II
Manhattan Project people
Baltimore City College alumni
People associated with the atomic bombings of Hiroshima and Nagasaki
Johns Hopkins University alumni
United States Army Air Forces officers
Recipients of the Air Medal
Recipients of the Silver Star
Recipients of the Distinguished Flying Cross (United States)
People from Pikesville, Maryland
20th-century American Jews